Euthima variegata is a species of beetle in the family Cerambycidae. It was described by Per Olof Christopher Aurivillius in 1921. It is known from Bolivia and Peru.

References

Onciderini
Beetles described in 1921